Jughead is a search engine system for the Gopher protocol. It is distinct from Veronica in that it searches a single server at a time.

Jughead was developed by Rhett Jones in 1993 at the University of Utah.

The name "Jughead" was originally chosen to match the Archie search engine, as Jughead Jones is Archie's friend in Archie Comics. Later a backronym was developed: Jonzy's Universal Gopher Hierarchy Excavation And Display.

It was released by the original author under the GNU General Public License in 2006, and its source code has been modernized to better run on current POSIX systems.

Due to trademark issues, the modified version was called Jugtail, and has been made available for download on GNU Savannah.

External links
Jughead Source
Jugtail Project

References

Internet protocols
Internet Standards
Unix Internet software
Gopher (protocol)
Internet search engines